= Red Hook Tavern =

Restaurant in New York City, U.S.

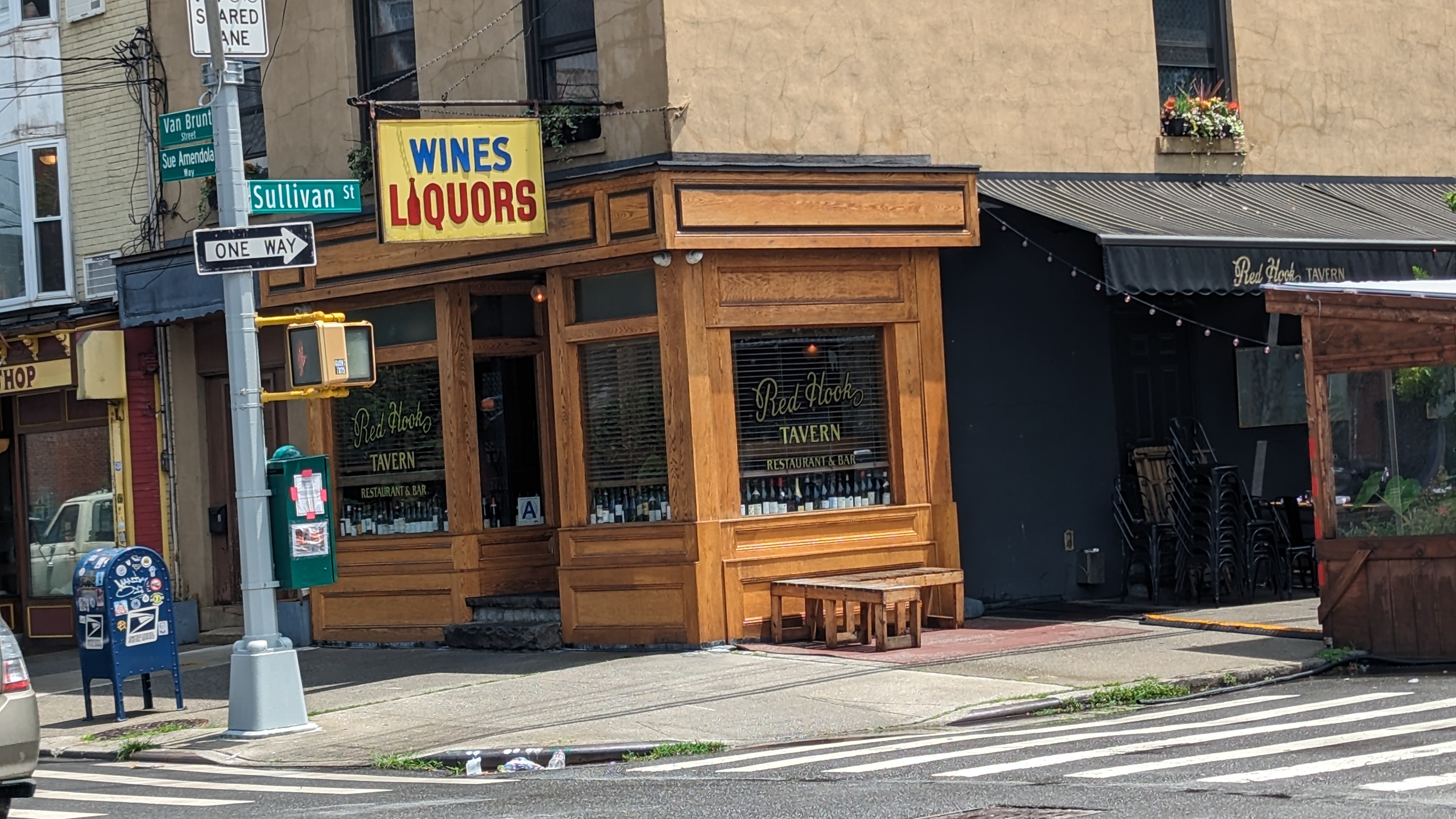
- The restaurant's exterior in 2023
- Interactive map of Red Hook Tavern

Restaurant information
- Established: July 18, 2019
- Location: 329 Van Brunt Street, Brooklyn, New York, 11231, United States
- Coordinates: 40°40′40″N 74°00′44″W

Red Hook Tavern is a restaurant in the Red Hook neighborhood of Brooklyn in New York City.
